Kuhiabad (also Romanized as Kūhīābād) is a village in Kahir Rural District, in the Central District of Konarak County, Sistan and Baluchestan Province, Iran. At the 2006 census, its population was 18, in 5 families.

References 

Populated places in Konarak County